Staryi Vovchynets is a village in Chernivtsi Raion, Chernivtsi Oblast, Ukraine. It belongs to Kamianka rural hromada, one of the hromadas of Ukraine. The Staryi Vovchynets village council is the body of the local authority that administers the villages of Stary Vovchynets and Bila Krynytsia.

Bila Krynytsia (Ukrainian: Біла Криниця;) village is located a few hundred metres north of the border with Romania. In Ukrainian and Romanian, as well as in Russian (Белая Криница), its name means "white well". A 2007 estimate puts the population at 169, of whom over three-quarters are Lipovans. Founded in 1784, the village was the seat of the first hierarch within the Orthodox Old-Rite Church's Belokrinitskaya Hierarchy until 1940. At that point, due to the Soviet occupation of Northern Bukovina, it moved to Brăila from two reasons: fear of persecution by the Soviet authorities and the fact that it was the only Lipovan village in Northern Bukovina. All other vicariates in its territory were located either in Southern Bukovina, which remained in Romania, or in other parts of Romania. In 1941, the village was the site of the Fântâna Albă massacre.

Until 18 July 2020, Staryi Vovchynets belonged to Hlyboka Raion. The raion was abolished in July 2020 as part of the administrative reform of Ukraine, which reduced the number of raions of Chernivtsi Oblast to three. The area of Hlyboka Raion was merged into Chernivtsi Raion.

References

Villages in Chernivtsi Raion